Valery Gelashvili (Georgian: ვალერი გელაშვილი; born on 18 January 1960), is a Georgian politician and businessman. He was the  Member of Parliament of Georgia 1999–2003, 2003–2005, 2012–2016. Gelashvili belonged to the construction company "Eurah", which was built in Avlabari residence in 2005, but disputes between the company and the state and the construction was transferred to another company.

Biography

Valery Gelashvili was born on 18 January 1960 in the village of Khanshuri.

In 1976, he graduated from the High School No.3 of the Transcaucasian Railway.

From 1977 to 1981, he studied at the Institute of Physical Culture at the Institute of Physical Culture of Georgia.

From 1981 to 1991, he worked as a teacher of physical culture.

From 1991 to 1999 he was the director general of the closed joint venture V & G.

Between 1999 and 2003 he was a majoritarian MP in Khashuri District of the Parliament of Georgia.

In 2003, the parliamentary majority granted him as a majoritarian MP. However, on July 14, 2005, after the brutal assault on political grounds, he left parliamentary activity.

From 2006 to 2012 he returned to the post of CEO V & G.

Between 2011 and 2012 he was the director of "Evra" LLC.

Since 2012, he is a member of the Georgian Dream party.

On top of all his ventures, he is also the sole shareholder of a construction company ‘Lit Geo Invest’.

On the same year, he became MP until 2016.

References

1960 births
Living people
People from Shida Kartli
Members of the Parliament of Georgia
Georgian Dream politicians